Fathi Chebel (born 19 August 1956) is a former footballer who played as a defender, spending his career in France. Born in France, he played for the Algeria national team internationally, most notably at the 1986 FIFA World Cup.

External links
 
 
 
 
 Fathi Chebel at sitercl.com

1956 births
Living people
Footballers from Lyon
Association football defenders
Algerian footballers
Algeria international footballers
French sportspeople of Algerian descent
AS Nancy Lorraine players
FC Metz players
Racing Besançon players
Racing Club de France Football players
AS Béziers Hérault (football) players
Bourges 18 players
FC Martigues players
US Créteil-Lusitanos players
RC Lens players
Al-Riyadh SC players
Saudi Professional League players
Ligue 1 players
Ligue 2 players
1986 FIFA World Cup players
Algerian football managers
US Créteil-Lusitanos managers
Algerian expatriate footballers
Algerian expatriate sportspeople in Saudi Arabia
Expatriate footballers in Saudi Arabia